Nelson Humberto Sanhueza Graavendaal  (born 1 May 1952) is a Chilean former professional footballer who played as a defender for clubs in Chile and Mexico.

Club career
A product of the Universidad Católica youth system, he made appearances for the club from 1971 to 1977, with a stint in the Segunda División from 1974 to 1975, winning the league title in 1975. He also played for them in 1979–80 after a stint in Mexico.

In Mexico, he played for Monterrey (1977–79), where he came thanks to the Chilean coach Fernando Riera, Atlético Potosino (1980–82, 1985–87), where he coincided with his compatriot Luis Castro, Puebla (1982–1985) and Correcaminos UAT (1987–88). 

As some achievements, he scored the goal number thousand for Monterrey and won the league title with Puebla in the 1982–83 season.

International career
Sanhueza made two appearances in friendly matches for the Chile senior team in 1976. Previously, in 1974 he played in a 1–0 win against Argentina where both squads were made up by players from the second level of each league system.

Coaching career
As head coach, he has led Toros Neza, Atlético Zacatepec, Correcaminos UAT and Jabatos Nuevo León.

Political views

Honours
Universidad Católica
 Segunda División de Chile: 1975

Puebla
 Primera División de México: 1982–83

References

External links
 
 Nelson Sanhueza at PlaymakerStats.com

1952 births
Living people
Footballers from Santiago
Chilean footballers
Chilean expatriate footballers
Chile international footballers
Club Deportivo Universidad Católica footballers
C.F. Monterrey players
Atlético Potosino footballers
Club Puebla players
Correcaminos UAT footballers
Chilean Primera División players
Primera B de Chile players
Liga MX players
Chilean expatriate sportspeople in Mexico
Expatriate footballers in Mexico
Association football defenders
Chilean football managers
Chilean expatriate football managers
Correcaminos UAT managers
Liga MX managers
Expatriate football managers in Mexico
Naturalized citizens of Mexico